Caballeronia humi is a Gram-negative, aerobic, non-motile bacterium from the genus Burkholderia and the family Burkholderiaceae which was isolated from peat soil in Russia.

References

External links
Type strain of Caballeronia humi at BacDive -  the Bacterial Diversity Metadatabase

Burkholderiaceae
Bacteria described in 2013